The 2004 NCAA Division I men's basketball tournament involved 65 schools playing in single-elimination play to determine the national champion of men's NCAA Division I college basketball. It began on March 16, 2004, and ended with the championship game on April 5 at the Alamodome in San Antonio, Texas. A total of 64 games were played.

The NCAA named, for the first time, the four tournament regions after regional site host cities instead of the "East", "Midwest", "South", and "West" designations. It was also the first year that the matchups for the national semifinals were determined at least in part by the overall seeding of the top team in each regional . The top four teams in the tournament were Kentucky, Duke, Stanford, and Saint Joseph's. Had all of those teams advanced to the Final Four, Kentucky would have played Saint Joseph's and Duke would have played Stanford in the semifinal games.

Of those teams, only Duke advanced to the Final Four. They were joined by Connecticut, making their first appearance since defeating Duke for the national championship in 1999, Oklahoma State, making their first appearance since 1995, and Georgia Tech, making their first appearance since 1990.

Connecticut defeated Georgia Tech 82–73 to win their second national championship in as many tries. Emeka Okafor of Connecticut was named the tournament's Most Outstanding Player.

As they had in 1999, Connecticut won their regional championship in Phoenix, Arizona.

Two of the tournament's top seeds failed to make it past the opening weekend. Kentucky, number one seed of the St. Louis region, and Stanford, #1 seed of the Phoenix region, both were defeated. Incidentally, both teams were defeated by schools from Alabama, as Kentucky fell to UAB while Stanford lost to Alabama.

Due to their strong 2003–04 season, Gonzaga achieved its highest NCAA tournament seed until 2013 by receiving the #2 seed in the St. Louis region. Gonzaga would receive a #1 seed in the 2013 tournament. The team failed to advance beyond the first weekend of the tournament, however.

Schedule and venues

The following are the sites that were selected to host each round of the 2004 tournament:

Opening Round
March 16
University of Dayton Arena, Dayton, Ohio (Host: University of Dayton)

First and Second Rounds
March 18 and 20
 HSBC Arena, Buffalo, New York (Hosts: Canisius College and Niagara University)
 KeyArena, Seattle, Washington (Host: University of Washington)
 Pepsi Center, Denver, Colorado (Hosts: Colorado State University and Mountain West Conference)
 RBC Center, Raleigh, North Carolina (Host: North Carolina State University)
March 19 and 21
 Bradley Center, Milwaukee, Wisconsin (Host: Marquette University)
 Kemper Arena, Kansas City, Missouri (Host: Big 12 Conference)
 Nationwide Arena, Columbus, Ohio (Host: Ohio State University)
 TD Waterhouse Centre, Orlando, Florida (Host: Stetson University)

Regional semifinals and finals (Sweet Sixteen and Elite Eight)
March 25 and 27
East Rutherford Regional, Continental Airlines Arena, East Rutherford, New Jersey (Host: Rutgers University)
Phoenix Regional, America West Arena, Phoenix, Arizona (Host: Arizona State University)
March 26 and 28
Atlanta Regional, Georgia Dome, Atlanta, Georgia (Host: Georgia Institute of Technology)
St. Louis Regional, Edward Jones Dome, St. Louis, Missouri (Host: Missouri Valley Conference)

National semifinals and championship (Final Four and championship)
April 3 and 5
Alamodome, San Antonio, Texas (Host: University of Texas at San Antonio)

Qualifying teams

Automatic bids
The following teams were automatic qualifiers for the 2004 NCAA field by virtue of winning their conference's tournament (except for the Ivy League, whose regular-season champion received the automatic bid).

Listed by region and seeding

Bids by conference

Record by conference

*Florida A&M University won the Opening Round game.

The America East, Atlantic Sun, Big Sky, Big South, CAA, Horizon League, Mid-Continent, Ivy, MAC, MEAC, Northeast, Ohio Valley, Patriot, SoCon, Southland, SWAC, and Sun Belt conferences all went 0–1.

The columns R32, S16, E8, F4, and CG respectively stand for the Round of 32, Sweet Sixteen, Elite Eight, Final Four, and championship Game.

Final Four

At Alamodome, San Antonio, Texas

National semifinals
April 3, 2004
Connecticut (W2) 79, Duke (S1) 78
 With the Connecticut Huskies trailing by 8 points with less than 3 minutes to go, it looked as if the Duke Blue Devils were going to spoil Jim Calhoun's chance at a second national title. Connecticut's All-American center Emeka Okafor was limited to just 22 minutes because of early foul trouble, but he came up clutch with several big plays down the stretch and finished with 18 points and only 3 fouls. By contrast, all three of Duke's centers fouled out, including Shelden Williams, who committed his fifth foul with 3:04 to play. In addition, Duke went without a field goal for the last 4 minutes until Chris Duhon's meaningless three-pointer at the buzzer. Duke coach Mike Krzyzewski was denied his 65th NCAA Tournament victory which would have tied him with Dean Smith for the all-time record. He later broke that record.
Georgia Tech (M3) 67, Oklahoma State (E2) 65
Will Bynum's layup in the final moments kept the Georgia Tech Yellow Jackets dream for a National Championship alive as they defeated the Oklahoma State Cowboys, in a nail-biter, in the first of the national semifinal doubleheader. Georgia Tech led for most of the game including a seven-point edge at halftime. However, Oklahoma State was able to tie the game on John Lucas's three-pointer with 26.3 seconds left. Georgia Tech then milked the clock which set up Bynum's game-winner. Georgia Tech advanced to their first ever National Championship appearance. Oklahoma State coach Eddie Sutton was denied yet another chance at an elusive national title.

National Championship Game
April 5, 2004
Connecticut (W2) 82, Georgia Tech (M3) 73
The 2004 National Championship Game proved to be a coronation for the Connecticut Huskies as they handled Paul Hewitt's Georgia Tech Yellow Jackets. Emeka Okafor led Connecticut with 24 points and was an easy choice for Most Outstanding Player of the tournament. Guard Ben Gordon added 21 points to Connecticut's cause. The victory gave Connecticut coach Jim Calhoun his second National Championship (1999).

Bracket
* – Denotes overtime period

Opening Round game – Dayton, Ohio
Winner advances to 16th seed in St. Louis Regional vs. (1) Kentucky.

East Rutherford Regional

St. Louis Regional

Atlanta Regional

Phoenix Regional

Final Four – San Antonio, Texas

Game summaries

Final four

National Championship

Announcers
Jim Nantz/Billy Packer/Bonnie Bernstein – First & Second Round at Denver, Colorado; East Rutherford Regional at East Rutherford, New Jersey; Final Four at San Antonio, Texas
Dick Enberg/Matt Guokas/Armen Keteyian – First & Second Round at Columbus, Ohio; Phoenix Regional at Phoenix, Arizona
Verne Lundquist and Bill Raftery – First & Second Round at Buffalo, New York; Atlanta Regional at Atlanta, Georgia
Gus Johnson and Len Elmore – First & Second Round at Orlando, Florida; St. Louis Regional at St. Louis, Missouri
Kevin Harlan and Dan Bonner – First & Second Round at Raleigh, North Carolina
Ian Eagle and Jim Spanarkel – First & Second Round at Seattle, Washington
Craig Bolerjack and Bob Wenzel – First & Second Round at Kansas City, Missouri
Tim Brando and Mike Gminski – First & Second Round at Milwaukee, Wisconsin

Greg Gumbel once again served as the studio host, joined by analysts Clark Kellogg and Seth Davis.

See also
 2004 NCAA Division I women's basketball tournament
 2004 NCAA Division II women's basketball tournament
 2004 NCAA Division III women's basketball tournament
 2004 National Invitation Tournament
 2004 Women's National Invitation Tournament
 2004 NAIA Division I men's basketball tournament
 2004 NAIA Division II men's basketball tournament
 2004 NAIA Division I women's basketball tournament
 2004 NAIA Division II women's basketball tournament

References

NCAA Division I men's basketball tournament
Ncaa
NCAA Division I men's basketball tournament
NCAA Division I men's basketball tournament
NCAA Division I men's basketball tournament
Basketball in San Antonio